Hitler and the Occult is a 1995 book about Nazi occultism by Ken Anderson.

1995 non-fiction books
Books about Adolf Hitler
Books about Nazism
English-language books
Occult books
Occultism in Nazism
Prometheus Books books